This is not to be confused with the poem by Gilbert Frankau.

The Voice of the Guns (1917) is a British military march composed by Kenneth Alford during World War I.  It was written as a tribute to British artillerymen serving in the war, hence its name, though later became widely adopted by the entire British army.

The piece is generally arranged for a full marching band or orchestra, though piano and organ versions have also been composed.  Maurice Jarre's score used an arrangement for piccolos (in lieu of fifes) with drums within his overture for "Lawrence Of Arabia", and he also rearranged the piece for a military band, assembled from the London Philharmonic Orchestra, which segues in an out of fragmentary motifs from the 'Lawrence' theme, later during the film. It is to be remarked that Jarre's arrangement of the march is quite different from the original, and it does not utilize the original 6-bar introduction.

The song starts out with three brief musical phrases, followed by a segue into the main triumphant, fast-moving marching theme which remains throughout the rest of the piece.  The full version of the piece generally lasts about three minutes, though longer and shorter arrangements have also been made.

An arrangement of it was famously used in David Lean's film Lawrence of Arabia (1962), to represent British Empire military power.  Its most notable use in the film occurs during the scene when Lawrence (Peter O'Toole) and General Allenby (Jack Hawkins) discuss strategy while descending the stairs of the British army headquarters in Cairo.

Today the piece remains a popular selection for marching bands and orchestras.  In 1983 the quick march of the Royal Artillery, "British Grenadiers" (in use by the regiment since 1762) was extended, by Lt. Col. Stanley Patch, to include the Trio section from "The Voice Of The Guns", in honour of the Royal Artillery's Captain General, Her Majesty Queen Elizabeth II. The tune British Grenadiers used by the Royal Artillery bands differs from that of the Grenadier Guards only by having different horn parts; other than that they are identical. Its association with the Royal Artillery predates the formation of the Grenadier Guards Regiment, and the Royal Artillery were the first British regiment to use the French grenate, or grenade.  The Royal Artillery were also the first British regiment to adopt the grenade as a badge symbol.

External links
MIDI sequence of piano version
 by the John Horn High School Wind Symphony

British military marches
1917 compositions
Songs with music by Kenneth J. Alford